Gozi is a town in Burkina Faso. It may also refer to:

People
Federico Gozi (1629–1634), Sammarinese politician
Giuliano Gozi (1894–1955), Sammarinese Fascist leader
Sandro Gozi (born 1968), Italian politician

Other uses
Gozi, Iran ( Jazin, Fars), an Iranian village
Gozi (Trojan horse), a computer spyware program

See also
Goza (disambiguation)
Gozo